(), plural , is an Arabic title meaning 'chief' or 'leader'. It comes from the word for head, . It is often translated as 'president' in Arabic, and as 'boss' in Persian. Swahili speakers may also use it for president. The Ottoman Turkish form of the title is reis, which denoted a captain (a term with identical etymology, being from Latin , 'head').

The term  is of pre-Islamic origin. It may function as an honorific laqab in a person's name. In the central Arab world, the term originally meant village headman.

British India
In British India the landed nobility in Muslim societies often used the word  to describe their aristocratic position held in society. The term  was also often used by Muslims when making deed of endowments in their community. Although the word meant 'chief' or 'leader', legal documents used it in the context of 'landlords' or landowners.

However, when describing any aspect of the management of their holdings, ' or zamindars' employed regal terminology. The  sat upon a throne (masand or gaddi). Riayat, whom British preferred to call tenants or cultivators were literally subjects. When a  met with his riayat he described himself as holding court (darbar). The money which riayat paid his lord was tribute (nazrana) not rent. The place where he paid the tribute was called a kachari, just as a government revenue office was, and the clerks who collected, kept accounts and ensured tributes kept coming on time were known by their Mughal courtly styles of (dewans) and (sipahis – a horse trooper).

Urdu

In Urdu, the word  is also used similarly to the English term "old money," as the opposite or antonym of nouveau riche, a person who has accumulated considerable wealth within his or her generation. 

When the book "The Pleasure of Philosophy" by Will Durant was translated into Urdu, by Syed Abid Ali Abid, he translated the word aristocracy with the Urdu word .

Palestine
The Arabic adjective  [  ](meaning 'great'), is also added to mean 'the great '.

In a New York Times op-ed, commentator Bret Stephens referred to late Palestinian leader Yasir Arafat as "the rais."

Tatarstan
In December 2022, regional lawmakers voted to change the title of the head of the republic from president to rais. The title of president was seen as the last remaining symbol of federalism following the centralization reforms under Vladimir Putin.

References

Arabic honorifics
Swahili words and phrases
Heads of state
Islamic honorifics
Military ranks
Royal titles
Noble titles
Positions of authority
Titles of national or ethnic leadership
Titles in India
Titles in Afghanistan
Titles in Pakistan
Ottoman titles
Turkish titles
Titles in Iran